Khalyan or Khalian may refer to:
 Khalian, Gilan
 Khalyan, West Azerbaijan
 Khalyan, Baghlan a village in Baghlan province Afghanistan